Kyaw Than may refer to:

 Kyaw Than (politician, born 1956), Burmese MP who represents Rakhine State
 Kyaw Than (politician, born 1965), Burmese MP who represents Kayah State